William Monsell, 1st Baron Emly, PC (21 September 1812 – 20 April 1894) was an Anglo-Irish landowner and Liberal politician. He held a number of ministerial positions between 1852 and 1873, notably as President of the Board of Health in 1857 and as Postmaster General between 1871 and 1873.

Background and education
Monsell was born to William Monsell (1778–1822), of Tervoe, Clarina, County Limerick, and Olivia, daughter of Sir John Johnson-Walsh, 1st Baronet, of Ballykilcavan. He was educated at Winchester (1826–1830) and Oriel College, Oxford, but he left the university without proceeding to a degree in 1831. As his father had died in 1824, he succeeded to the family estates on coming of age and was a popular landlord, the more so as he was resident. In 1843 he helped found St Columba's College in Whitechurch, now part of Dublin.

Political career

Monsell served as the Sheriff of County Limerick in 1835. In 1847, he was elected Member of Parliament for County Limerick as a Liberal, and represented the constituency until 1874. In 1850, he became a Roman Catholic and thereafter took a prominent part in Catholic affairs, especially in Parliament. As a friend of Wiseman, Newman, Montalambert, W. G. Ward, and other eminent Catholics, he was intimately acquainted with the various interests of the Church, and his parliamentary position was often of great advantage to the Church.

In 1852 Monsell was appointed Clerk of the Ordnance by Lord Aberdeen, a post he retained until 1857, the last two years under the premiership of Lord Palmerston. In 1855 he was sworn of the Privy Council. He was briefly President of the Board of Health under Palmerston in 1857 and later served under Lord Russell as Paymaster-General and Vice-President of the Board of Trade in 1866 and under William Ewart Gladstone as Under-Secretary of State for the Colonies between 1868 and 1871 and as Postmaster-General between January 1871 and November 1873. He was also Lord Lieutenant of County Limerick between 1871 and 1894 and Vice-Chancellor of the Royal University of Ireland between 1885 and 1894.

On 12 January 1874 Monsell was raised to the peerage as Baron Emly, of Tervoe in the County of Limerick. He lost much of his popularity in Ireland during his later years, because of his opposition to the Irish National Land League and to the home rule movement in Ireland. His work being chiefly parliamentary, he wrote little, but published some articles in the Home and Foreign Review and a "Lecture on the Roman Question" (1860).

Family
Lord Emly was twice married. He married firstly Lady Anna Maria Charlotte Wyndham-Quin (1814–1855), only daughter of Windham Quin, 2nd Earl of Dunraven and Mount-Earl, in August 1836, with whom he had two sons, both of whom died in infancy. After her death on 7 January 1855, he married Bertha (1835–1890), youngest daughter the Comte de Montigny of the house of Montigny de Perreux, in 1857, by whom he had one son Gaston (1858–1932), later the second Lord Emly, and one daughter Mary Olivia (1860–1942). Lord Emly died in April 1894, aged 81.

Arms

References

Sources
 
 Matthew Potter, William Monsell of Tervoe 1812–1894 Catholic Unionist, Anglo-Irishman, Foreword by Gearóid O Tuathaigh (Dublin: Irish Academic Press,2009).
 Matthew Potter, 'A Catholic Unionist. The Life and Times of William Monsell, First Baron Emly of Tervoe 1812–1894', (unpublished Ph.D thesis NUI Galway, 2001).

External links 
 

1812 births
1894 deaths
19th-century Anglo-Irish people
People educated at Winchester College
Monsell, William
Monsell, William
Lord-Lieutenants of Limerick
Monsell, William
Monsell, William
Members of the Privy Council of the United Kingdom
Monsell, William
Monsell, William
Monsell, William
Monsell, William
Monsell, William
Monsell, William
Monsell, William
UK MPs who were granted peerages
English Roman Catholics
Converts to Roman Catholicism
Catholic Unionists
Barons in the Peerage of the United Kingdom
High Sheriffs of County Limerick
Statistical and Social Inquiry Society of Ireland
Peers of the United Kingdom created by Queen Victoria